Petyo Dinkov (born 8 December 1979 in Sofia) is a Bulgarian football midfielder who currently plays for Bansko.

References

External links
 

1979 births
Living people
Bulgarian footballers
Association football midfielders
First Professional Football League (Bulgaria) players
Second Professional Football League (Bulgaria) players
PFC Slavia Sofia players
PFC Belasitsa Petrich players
PFC Minyor Pernik players
OFC Vihren Sandanski players
FC Bansko players